Alberto Gavaldá Pina (born 5 November 1992) is a Spanish sprinter.

He won the silver medal over 200 metres at the 2009 World Youth Championships in Athletics.

Competition record

1Did not start in the semifinals

Notes

References

External links
 
 

1992 births
Living people
Spanish male sprinters
European Games competitors for Spain
Athletes (track and field) at the 2019 European Games
Sportspeople from Zaragoza